The 2021–22 West Ham United F.C. Women season was the club's 31st season in existence and their fourth in the FA Women's Super League, the highest level of the football pyramid. Along with competing in the WSL, the club also contested two domestic cup competitions: the FA Cup and the League Cup.

On 20 May 2021, Jack Sullivan stepped down as managing director after four years in the job.

Following the final game of the season, it was announced Olli Harder had informed the club of his resignation to pursue new opportunities. Assistant manager Paul Konchesky was immediately announced as his successor on a two-year contract.

Squad

Preseason

FA Women's Super League

Results summary

Results by matchday

Results

League table

Women's FA Cup 

As a member of the first tier, West Ham entered the FA Cup in the fourth round proper.

FA Women's League Cup

Group stage

Knockout stage

Squad statistics

Appearances 

Starting appearances are listed first, followed by substitute appearances after the + symbol where applicable.

|}

Transfers

Transfers in

Loans in

Transfers out

References 

West Ham United